Fishamble: The New Play Company is a Dublin-based theatre company specialising in new writing.

History

Fishamble: The New Play Company originated as Pigsback, a company whose roots were in student drama. One of the founders of Pigsback and current artistic director of Fishamble, Jim Culleton, graduated in Drama Studies from Trinity College Dublin, where he met Fishamble's Literary Officer, Gavin Kostick.  In 1988, Pigsback's first major outing took place as a summer season in Players Theatre where they staged Steven Berkoff's West and Tom Paulin's The Riot Act. This was followed by a January 1989 production of Peter Barnes's Red Noses at the Project Arts Centre. It was this show, said Jim Culleton, that 'established us as a company that is here to stay, a company with a professional standard of production.'  
Having experimented with a variety of plays, by 1990, Pigsback members had come to the realisation that it was specifically new writing that they were excited by. According to Jim Culleton,'we realised we wanted to come up with plays ourselves – plays we felt strongly about, that suited us. We wanted to encourage new writing.' A major step forward for the company took place in 1990 when they commissioned a new version of Moliere's Don Juan from Michael West. The result was a success and clarified Pigsback's vision, which, in Jim Culleton's words, was: 'to find something that is artistically challenging and contemporary. We don't want to immerse ourselves in any one style except what is theatrical or exciting and based as far as possible on new writings, adaptations or translations.'

From 1990, Pigsback consistently won annual financial support from the Arts Council (Ireland), which allowed the company to expand its activities to engage with venues and partners outside of Dublin. Between 1990 and 2009, the company produced 30 world premiers, along with dozens of short play festivals; it organised regular courses, workshops and seminars, often focused on developing new writing. In 2004, the Arts Council grant to Fishamble was €248,312, eight times the award of 1994.

During this period, the company had undertaken a major rebranding, to help underline its sense of clarity in its own mission. In 1997, the company was renamed 'Fishamble' in honour of Dublin's Fishamble Street, where in 1784, Robert Owenson established the first theatre dedicated to producing new Irish plays. This change to 'Fishamble' was also inspired by an appreciation that Ireland was becoming more multi-cultural and the world of Theatre more global. The company made a decision to present new writing to the Irish stage, without that writing having to be a new Irish play. As Jim Culleton explained: 'when we commissioned short plays a while back [1997], we ended up getting submissions from Cambodia and Vietnam and Australia and the States and Canada and all over Europe. And we thought, well, we’ve asked for submissions and people have submitted... we won't rule anyone out because they're not based in Ireland or Irish.'

One measure of success for this outlook has been recognition of the value of the company's work by the Arts Council. In 2006, it was designated a, 'Regularly Funded Organisation.' Fishamble's productions continued to grow in impact from that time and its emphasis on the production of new writing was embodied with the incorporation of 'The New Play Company' into its branding.

During 2013, to celebrate the company's 25th birthday, Fishamble donated its living archive to the National Library of Ireland.

In 2017, Fishamble produced seven plays, which led to 196 performances in 55 venues. In 2018, it plans major productions around new writing from Colin Murphy (author of Bailed Out and Guaranteed!), and Deirdre Kinahan, an organiser of the Waking the Feminists campaign for more female playwrights. For 2019, Fishamble will produce the winners of a competition for a "Play for Ireland", which it launched late in 2017.

In 2020 Fishamble decided to stream their production Inside The GPO on Easter Sunday due to the COVID-19 pandemic.

Awards 

The Laurence Olivier Award are recognised internationally as the highest honour in British theatre, equivalent to the BAFTA Awards for film and television, and the BRIT Awards for music. In 2016, Fishamble: The New Play Company and actor/writer Pat Kinevane were presented with the Olivier Award for Outstanding Achievement in an Affiliate Theatre for Silent. President of Ireland Michael D. Higgins said of this (and other Irish successes that year), 'the Olivier Awards are the most prestigious theatre awards in the United Kingdom and the awards won by Irish nominees are a great recognition and tribute to Irish theatre.'

Other awards won by Fishamble productions include the Scotsman Fringe First award; the Herald Angel; The Argus Angel; The 1st Irish; The Stage; Adelaide Fringe Best Theatre; Dublin Fringe; Forbes' Best Theater; Stage Raw LA; and Irish Times Theatre Awards

Additionally, many of Fishamble's playwrights have won Irish Writers Guild ZeBBies and Stewart Parker Trust awards.

New writing 
Notable Irish writers whose plays have been developed, produced and commissioned by Fishamble include Maeve Binchy, Sebastian Barry, Joseph O'Connor, Mark O'Rowe, Dermot Bolger, Marina Carr, Colum McCann, Pat Kinevane and Gary Duggan.

Fishamble supports new Irish writing through a variety of initiatives, courses and mentorship programs. Since 2007, Fishamble has awarded the New Writing Award for a production within the Dublin Fringe Festival. Previous winners that have since toured internationally include Elaine Murphy for 'Little Gem' and Amy Conroy for 'I heart Alice heart I'.  In conjunction with the Dublin Fringe Festival and Irish Theatre Institute, Fishamble has run the 'Show in a Bag' initiative since 2010. 'Show in a Bag' assists actors, either solo or in pairs, to write a script and produce a show for the Dublin Fringe, which then has the potential to tour. Previous 'Show in a Bag' productions have toured throughout Ireland and internationally. The company also offers the New Play Clinic, an initiative to assist in the dramaturgical development of new plays to be performed in Ireland.

Productions 
The Alternative (2019) by Michael Patrick and Oisín Kearney
Spinning (2015)
Swing (2014)
Guaranteed! By Colin Murphy (2013)
Tiny Plays for Ireland 2 (2013)
Mainstream (one-off performance) By Rosaleen McDonagh (2012)
Great Goat Bubble By Julian Gough (2012)
Tiny Plays for Ireland 1 (2012)
The Wheelchair on My Face by Sonya Kelly (2012– present)
The End of the Road by Gavin Kostick (2011)
Silent by Pat Kinevane (2011– present)
Big Ole Piece of Cake by Sean McLoughlin (2010)
Turning Point (in Association with Arts & Disability Ireland) (2010)
Forgotten by Pat Kinevane (2007– present)
Strandline by Abbie Spallen (2009)
Handel's Crossing by Joseph O'Connor (2009)
Begotten Not Made (staged reading) by Paul Meade (2009)
Rank by Robert Massey (2008)
Noah and the Tower Flower by Sean Macloughlin (2007) (New York, 2011)
The Pride of Parnell Street by Sebastian Barry (2007–2009),(2011)
Whereabouts (series of short, site-specific plays) (2006)
The Gist of It by Rodney Lee (2006)
55˚ and Rising (in association with British Council, series of Scottish play readings) (2005)
Monged by Gary Duggan (2005)
She Was Wearing... (in association with Amnesty International) (2005)
Pilgrims in the Park by Jim O'Hanlon (2004)
Dislocated: A Series of Readings (plays by German, Irish and British writers) (2004)
Tadhg Stray Wandered in by Michael Collins (2004)
Radio Plays with Lyric Fm (2003)
The Buddhist of Castleknock by Jim O’Hanlon (2003) 
Shorts (in association with Project Arts) (2003)
Still by Rosalind Haslett (2002)
The Carnival King by Ian Kilroy (2001)
Wired to the Moon by Maeve Binchy (2001)
The Music of Ghostlight (one-off performance) By Joseph O'Connor (2000)
Y2K Festival (series of plays surrounding the new millennium) (2000)
The Plains of Enna by Pat Kinevane (1999)
True Believers by Joe O'Connor (1999)
The Nun's Wood by Pat Kinevane (1998)
From Both Hips by Mark O'Rowe (1997)

As Pigsback 
The Flesh Addict by Gavin Kostick (1996)
Sardines by Michael West (1995)
Red Roses and Petrol by Joe O'Connor (1995)
Jack Ketch's Gallows Jig by Gavin Kostick (1994)
Buffalo Bill Has Gone to Alaska by Colin Teenan (1993)
The Ash Fire by Gavin Kostick (1992–1993)
The Tender Trap by Michael West (1992)
Howling Moons, Silent Sons by Deirdre Hines (1991)
This Love Thing by Marina Carr (1991)
Don Juan by Michael West (1990)

References

External links
 Fishamble: The New Play Company Website

Further reading
 
 
 

All articles covered by WikiProject Wikify
Theatre in Ireland
1988 establishments in Ireland